James Katsuhide Asato (July 18, 1927 – May 11, 2022) was an American football and baseball coach. He served as the head coach at the University of Hawaii from 1962 to 1964. In June 1953, he married Agnes Fujiwara.

Asato died in Honolulu on May 11, 2022, at the age of 94.

Head coaching record

Football

References

1927 births
2022 deaths
People from Maui
Hawaii Rainbow Warriors baseball coaches
Hawaii Rainbow Warriors football coaches
Hawaii Rainbow Warriors football players